Dutch people in Finland are immigrants from the Netherlands living in Finland. They numbered around 2,000 in 2017 and live mainly in the cities of Helsinki and Espoo.

History
The Dutch had a significant effect on the development of trade in Finland. Many of them settled permanently in Finland. They also had high positions in the administration of large cities.

Demographics
79.8% of the Dutch immigrants in Finland are men. 663 Dutch men are in a registered relationship with a Finnish woman. There are 1,082 male Dutch citizens, which means that over 61% of Dutch men in Finland are in a registered relationship with a Finnish woman. 148 Dutch citizens were naturalized between 1990 and 2017, with 22 in 2017. A total of 5,394 people immigrated from the Netherlands to Finland between 1990 and 2017, with 275 in 2017. Over 400 Dutch immigrants live in Helsinki and over 200 in Espoo. There are 541 Finnish-Dutch dual citizens. 52% are non-religious and 48% are Christian.

Employment
Dutch citizens were the second most employed group in Finland in 2008 after Kenyans, at 60.2%, compared to Finnish citizens at 44.7%. There were over 100 Dutch entrepreneurs in 2017. Over 33% were outside the labour force, and 6.4% pensioners.

Society
Around 300 Dutch people living in Finland celebrated the new king in 2013.

Notable Dutch people in Finland

 Thomas Lam, footballer
 Koop Arponen, singer
 George de Godzinsky, composer and conductor
 Kristian Meurman, singer
 Matthias Versluis, figure skater

See also 
 Finland–Netherlands relations

References

Finland
Finland
Ethnic groups in Finland